Ticopa is a genus of spiders in the family Corinnidae. It was first described in 2015 by Raven. , it contains 6 species, all from Australia.

Species
Ticopa comprises the following species:
Ticopa australis Raven, 2015
Ticopa carnarvon Raven, 2015
Ticopa chinchilla Raven, 2015
Ticopa dingo Raven, 2015
Ticopa hudsoni Raven, 2015
Ticopa longbottomi Raven, 2015

References

Corinnidae
Araneomorphae genera
Spiders of Australia